Getenesh Urge (born 30 August 1970) is a retired Ethiopian middle distance runner who competed in the 1980s through to 2000. She competed in the women's 1500 metres at the 1992 Summer Olympics.

She won three bronze medals at three different African Championships in Athletics.  In Annaba at the 1988 Championships she won a bronze in the 1500 metres, she repeated this performance five years later in Durban at the 1993 Championships. This after the 1992 Championships in Mauritius where she won a bronze in the 3000 metres. She also won a bronze medal in Cairo at the 1991 All-Africa Games, again in the 1500 metres. She finished thirteenth in 5000 metres at the 1999 World Championships.

She has also been a part of six medal winning teams in the IAAF World Cross Country Championships finishing 31st in 1990 in winning a team silver, 28th in 1992 in winning a team bronze, 14th in 1994 in winning a team silver, 29th in 1996 in winning a team silver, 21st in 1998 in winning a team silver and 17th in 2000 in winning a team silver, all bar 2000 in the long course event.

Personal bests
1500 metres - 4:10.75 min (2000)
3000 metres - 8:43.74 min (2000)
5000 metres - 15:22.44 min (2000)
10,000 metres - 32:44.82 min (2000)
Half marathon - 1:12:04 min (2000)

References

External links

1970 births
Living people
Ethiopian female middle-distance runners
African Games bronze medalists for Ethiopia
African Games medalists in athletics (track and field)
Athletes (track and field) at the 1992 Summer Olympics
Olympic athletes of Ethiopia
Athletes (track and field) at the 1991 All-Africa Games
20th-century Ethiopian women